"Seventeen Ain't Young" is a bubblegum pop song written by American composer Jeff Barry for The Archies' 1968 debut album, The Archies.  It was covered by Frankie Howson (with another Archies song) in 1969 and became a top 40 hit in Melbourne, Australia. His recording was produced by Australian DJ Stan Rofe.

References

1968 songs
1969 songs
The Archies songs
Songs written by Jeff Barry
Songs from television series